The Man in the Moon is an American musical variety television special broadcast by NBC on April 16, 1960. It was directed by Barry Shear and co-written by Mel Brooks.

Cast
Andy Williams
Tony Randall
Lisa Kirk
Diahann Carroll
Bambi Linn
James Mitchell
Cloris Leachman
Jester Hairston

References

External links
The Man in the Moon at IMDb
The Man in the Moon at TCMDB

1960 television specials
1960s American television specials
NBC television specials
Music television specials